Eleocharis fennica is a species of flowering plant belonging to the family Cyperaceae.

Its native range is Europe to China.

References

fennica